Marilyn is a 2018 Argentine drama film directed by Martín Rodríguez Redondo and based on the true story of Marilyn (Marcelo Bernasconi). It was screened in the Panorama section at the 68th Berlin International Film Festival.

Plot

Marcos is an 17-year-old living on a rented cattle ranch with his older brother and parents, Carlos and Olga. Marcos has sewn female clothing and stolen accessories and attends a local carnival dressed as his female alter-ego, Marilyn. There, he dances with the son of a local rancher, who recognizes who Marilyn is and feels embarrassed. As Marcos leaves the carnival and heads home, he is stopped by the rancher's son and raped. When Marilyn returns home the next morning, Olga is furious at her child's activities and destroys all of his female clothing.

When Carlos dies suddenly, the family is forced to consider leaving the ranch and moving to a new urban development. While visiting the development, Marcos meets another young man who works in a local shop and they begin a relationship. Olga discovers the relationship and takes away Marcos' mobile phone. He wakes up early one morning and kills both his brother and his mother.

Cast
 Walter Rodríguez as Marcos/Marilyn
 Catalina Saavedra as Olga
 Germán de Silva as Carlos

References

External links
 

2018 films
2018 drama films
2018 LGBT-related films
Argentine drama films
2010s Spanish-language films
Gay-related films
LGBT-related drama films
Argentine LGBT-related films
LGBT-related films based on actual events
2010s Argentine films